In mathematics, an Eells–Kuiper manifold is a compactification of  by a sphere of dimension , where , or . It is named after James Eells and Nicolaas Kuiper.

If , the Eells–Kuiper manifold is diffeomorphic to the real projective plane . For  it is simply-connected and has the integral cohomology structure of the complex projective plane , of the quaternionic projective plane  or of the Cayley projective plane.

Properties
These manifolds are important in both Morse theory and foliation theory:

Theorem: Let  be a connected closed manifold (not necessarily orientable) of dimension . Suppose  admits a Morse function  of class  with exactly three singular points. Then  is a Eells–Kuiper manifold.

Suppose the number of centers  of the foliation  is more than the number of saddles . Then there are two possibilities:

See also
 Reeb sphere theorem

References

Foliations
Manifolds